Moquah Barrens Research Natural Area is a  area of pine barrens in Bayfield County, Wisconsin. It is located within the Chequamegon-Nicolet National Forest. The area was designated a Wisconsin State Natural Area in 1970 and a National Natural Landmark in 1980.

The source of the Flag River is located within the northwest corner of the natural area.

References

Protected areas of Bayfield County, Wisconsin
National Natural Landmarks in Wisconsin
State Natural Areas of Wisconsin
Protected areas established in 1970
1970 establishments in Wisconsin